Roneys Point is an unincorporated community in Ohio County, West Virginia, United States. Roneys Point is located along Little Wheeling Creek on the National Road (U.S. Route 40) between Point Mills and Valley Camp. It is part of the Wheeling, West Virginia Metropolitan Statistical Area.

Roney's point most likely was named for an early settler with the surname Roney (first name unknown).

References

Unincorporated communities in Ohio County, West Virginia
National Road
Unincorporated communities in West Virginia